Turkuvaz Media Group is a Turkish media company. The company was sold to Çalık Holding in Aşiyan, Yıldız, Beşiktaş, Istanbul 2008. As of 2014 the company operates under Kemerburgaz, Eyüp, Göktürk, İstanbul in Kalyon Group.  The company's Ahmet Çalık is Sadık Albayrak, son of Berat Albayrak, former Minister of Treasury and Finance who is married to the daughter of Recep Tayyip Erdoğan. The company is also known as Sabah-ATV Group.

Government ties 
Turkuvaz Media Group has been described as having a pro-government stance. Ceren Sözeri described the group as "Pelikanist" and she claimed that the media group published fake news during the 2019 Istanbul Mayoral Election. It has been discovered that Turkuvaz Media Group owned 18.37% of the public resources distributed through formal advertising. Zehra Yildiz criticised the independence and freedom of Turkuvaz Media Group along with other media companies due to them joining public contracts and having a commercial relationship with the state.

Controversies 
Turkuvaz Media Group charged Berna Laçin, a Turkish actress whose theatre plays were banned by the provincial governorships, with "being a headscarf advesary" , "having a provocative character", and "insulting Medina". Laçin announced that she will file a criminal complaint about the incident.
It was claimed in an ATV-A Haber mutual broadcast that cheats codes of the game GTA IV written on a paper sheet were "coup instructions".
Turkish mafia leader Sedat Peker stated that Turkuvaz Media Group was a part of operations conducted against him.

List of brands and media outlets 
Sabah, Takvim, Fotomaç, Daily Sabah, Yeni Asır, Fikriyat, Sabah Avrupa, Sabah USA, Sabah Sarı Sayfalar, Yeniasirilan.com, ATV, A2, A Haber, A Haber Radyo, A Spor, A Spor Radyo, A News, ATV Avrupa, Minika, Minika Çocuk, Minika Go, Teknokulis, Aktüel, Bebeğim, China Today, Cosmopolitan, Cosmopolitan Bride, Esquire, Forbes, Harper's Bazaar, Home Art, House Beautiful, Lacivert, Otohaber, Para, Sofra, Şamdan, Turkuvaz Matbaacılık, Turkuvaz Dağıtım Pazarlama, Turkuvaz Mobil Medya, Abone Turkuvaz, Turkuvaz Radyoları, Turkuvaz Kitap, D&R, Vav TV and Vav Radyo.

References

External links 

Mass media companies of Turkey
Beşiktaş
Eyüp